Noir (or noire) is the French word for black. It may also refer to:

Places 
In Canada
 Noire River (Ottawa River tributary), in the Outaouais region of Quebec
 Noire River, a tributary of the Yamaska River in Eastern Townships area, Quebec

In France
 La Roche-Noire, a village and commune in the Puy-de-Dôme department
 Montagne Noire, a mountain range

In Guadeloupe
 Pointe-Noire, Guadeloupe, a commune on Guadeloupe

In the Republic of the Congo
 Pointe-Noire, second largest city in the Republic of the Congo
 Pointe Noire Airport, airport of Pointe-Noire
 Pointe-Noire Bay, bay at Pointe-Noire

People
Noir (surname)

Arts, entertainment, and media

Genres
 Film noir, a film genre
 Neo-noir, a modern form of film noir
 Horror noir, psychological horror and supernatural horror mystery in a noir film (List) or an occult detective ghost hunter film
 Tech-noir, technophiles and technology harming a society in a dystopian setting
 Folk noir, a music genre
 Noir fiction, a literary genre closely related to hardboiled genre
 Scandinavian noir, Scandinavian crime fiction

Comics
 Magie Noire, a 2003 comic by the Ivorian painter and author Gilbert G. Groud
 Marvel Noir, a 2009 thematic stories based on Marvel universe
 Noir: A Collection of Crime Comics, a 2009 black-and-white crime comics anthology

Fictional characters
 Noir, alias of Ray Balzac Courland in Gorgeous Carat manga
 Noir, a character in the video game La Pucelle: Tactics (2002)
 Noire, a character in the video game Fire Emblem: Awakening (2012)
 Noire, a character in the video game Hyperdimension Neptunia
 Cat Noir (Chat Noir in the French dub and Black Cat in the Korean dub), the superhero identity of protagonist Adrien Agreste in Miraculous: Tales of Ladybug & Cat Noir
 Guy Noir, a fictional private detective in A Prairie Home Companion radio show
 Jack Noir, a character in the webcomic Homestuck
 Madame Noir, a character in the Ressha Sentai ToQger
 Spider-Man Noir, a Marvel comic book character
 Vince Noir, a fictional character in the BBC television comedy The Mighty Boosh
 Noir (ノワール), the main antagonist in the anime series Kirakira PreCure a la Mode
 Noir Stardia, the main protagonist in the anime series The Hidden Dungeon Only I Can Enter
 Noir is the codename of Haru Okumura in the role-playing game Persona 5
 Black Noir, a character in the comic and TV series The Boys

Games 
 Discworld Noir, a 1999 video game by GT Interactive
 L.A. Noire, a 2011 video game by Rockstar Games
 Noir: A Shadowy Thriller, a 1996 video game by Cyberdreams
 Trente et Quarante (English translation: Thirty and Forty), a gambling game also called Rouge et Noir (English translation: Red and Black)

Music
Groups and labels
 Noir (band), a South Korean boy band which debuted in 2018
 Noir, a poetic/techno music duo comprising Georg Kajanus and Tim Dry
 Gravity Noir, a British synth-pop band that was established in the early 1990s

Albums
 Noir (Callisto album), 2006
 Noir (William Control album), 2010
 Noir (BSBD album), 2011
 Noir (B.A.P album), 2016
 Noir (Smino album), 2018

Songs
 "Noir" (song), released by Sunmi in 2019

Other uses in music
 Noire, in musical instructions, quarter note

Other arts, entertainment, and media
 Film noir, crime film style from the 1940s and 1950s 
 Noir (film), a 2015 Canadian film
 Noir (novel), a 1998 novel by K. W. Jeter
 Noir (TV series), a 2001 Japanese anime television series about a pair of female assassins
 Souris noire, a 1987 French television series

Brands and enterprises
 Noir (fashion), a Danish luxury fashion brand
 Drakkar Noir, a men's cologne
 Pinot noir, a wine
 Série noire, a French publishing imprint

Other uses 
 Legion Noire (English translation: Black Legion), a military unit of the French Revolutionary Army
 Royale Noir, a Windows XP theme
 Notice of Intent to Revoke (NOIR), a notice by the U.S. Citizenship and Immigration Services
 Bugatti La Voiture Noire: Bugatti Chiron mid-engine two-seater sports car

See also 
 Bande noire (disambiguation)
 Bête noire (disambiguation)